The men's discus throw event at the 1989 Summer Universiade was held at the Wedaustadion in Duisburg on 28 and 29 August 1989.

Medalists

Results

Qualification

Final

References

Athletics at the 1989 Summer Universiade
1989